Pierrick Lilliu (born 13 July 1986), is a French rock-singer living in Brittany and was born in Mulhouse, Alsace from a Sardinian father.  He appeared in the French reality show Nouvelle Star and placed 2nd against Myriam Abel on 12 May 2005.

After the show, he recorded his first single, "À cœur ouvert", which he first sang on stage on 19 May and was officially released on 30 May 2005. His album Besoin d'espace (Need of space) went on sale on 17 October 2005.

Lilliu is the eldest of three children in the Lilliu family, and his younger brother, Nyco Lilliu, is also a singer.

Discography

Albums

Singles

Filmography
 2006 : Le héros de la famille by Thierry Klifa.

References

External links 
 Official site
 Official MySpace

1986 births
Living people
Nouvelle Star participants
Musicians from Mulhouse
French people of Sardinian descent
21st-century French singers
21st-century French male singers